618 shopping day is a shopping festival created by JD.com. The festival is celebrated annually on the 18th June (6th Month), hence the name '618'.

'618' is significant as is the date JD.com was founded by Liu Qiangdong on 18th June, 1998.
It was first started in 2010, as a competitor to the shopping festival launched by rival Taobao, Singles's Day (or Double 11 in Chinese).

In 2022, JD.com saw slower growth in the 618 shopping day event, due to slowing economic conditions and COVID-19 outbreaks in china.

Adoption

Since its creation in 2010, June 18th has become the second largest shopping day in China after Singles' Day on November 11th. Although originally created by JD.com, it has now been adopted by other platforms, including Taobao, Pinduoduo and others. The volume of sales rivals Black Friday in the US. In 2020, there were hundreds of billions of USD in sales occurring across multiple platforms. Massive volumes of sales have been reported in other years as well.

A number of foreign companies operating in China have also taken part in the festival and offered their own deals for June 18th. In 2019, Apple sold 100 million CNY (about 15 million USD) of products within the first three minutes.

References

Annual events in China